Heusler is an unincorporated community in Marrs Township, Posey County, in the U.S. state of Indiana.

History
A post office was established at Heusler in 1893, and remained in operation until it was discontinued in 1903. Ernest H. C. Heusler served as postmaster and gave the community its name.

Geography

References

Unincorporated communities in Posey County, Indiana
Unincorporated communities in Indiana